Youxi  is a county of central Fujian province, People's Republic of China. It is under the administration of Sanming City.

Transportation
 Xiangtang–Putian Railway

Climate

Administrative divisions
Towns:
Chengguan, Youxikou, Meixian, Xibin, Xinyang, Yangzhong, Guanqian, Xicheng, Banmian

Townships:
Lianhe Township, Tangchuan Township, Xiwei Township, Zhongxian Township, Taixi Township, Baziqiao Township

References

County-level divisions of Fujian
Sanming